The Brigantine Public Schools is a community public school district that serves students in pre-kindergarten through eighth grade from Brigantine, in Atlantic County, New Jersey, United States.

As of the 2018–19 school year, the district, comprising two schools, had an enrollment of 563 students and 68.0 classroom teachers (on an FTE basis), for a student–teacher ratio of 8.3:1.

The district is classified by the New Jersey Department of Education as being in District Factor Group "CD", the sixth-highest of eight groupings. District Factor Groups organize districts statewide to allow comparison by common socioeconomic characteristics of the local districts. From lowest socioeconomic status to highest, the categories are A, B, CD, DE, FG, GH, I and J.

Students in public school for ninth through twelfth grades, along with those from Longport, Margate City and Ventnor City, attend Atlantic City High School in neighboring Atlantic City, as part of sending/receiving relationships with the Atlantic City School District. As of the 2018–19 school year, the high school had an enrollment of 1,796 students and 153.0 classroom teachers (on an FTE basis), for a student–teacher ratio of 11.7:1.

Awards and recognition
Brigantine Elementary School was recognized by Governor Jim McGreevey in 2003 as one of 25 schools selected statewide for the First Annual Governor's School of Excellence award.

Schools
Schools in the district (with 2018–19 enrollment data from the National Center for Education Statistics) are:
Brigantine Elementary School with 329 students in grades PreK-4
Jennifer Luff, Principal
Middle school
Brigantine North Middle School with 254 students in grades 5-8
Kathleen Fox, Principal

Administration
Core members of the district's administration are:
Glenn Robbins, Superintendent
Jonathan Houdart, Business Administrator / Board Secretary

Board of education
The district's board of education has seven members who set policy and oversee the fiscal and educational operation of the district through its administration. As a Type I school district, the board's trustees are appointed by the Mayor to serve three-year terms of office on a staggered basis, with either two or three members up for reappointment each year. Of the more than 600 school districts statewide, Brigantine is one of 15 districts with appointed school districts. The board appoints a superintendent to oversee the day-to-day operation of the district.

References

External links
Brigantine Public Schools
 
School Data for the Brigantine Public Schools, National Center for Education Statistics

Brigantine, New Jersey
New Jersey District Factor Group CD
School districts in Atlantic County, New Jersey